The Embassy of Georgia in London is the diplomatic mission of Georgia in the United Kingdom. Diplomatic relations between the two countries were originally established in 1919, effectively terminated after 1921, but restored in 1992 following dissolution of the Soviet Union.

Gallery

See also
 Georgia–United Kingdom relations

References

External links
Official site

Georgia
Diplomatic missions of Georgia (country)
Georgia (country)–United Kingdom relations
Buildings and structures in the Royal Borough of Kensington and Chelsea
Holland Park